Bogdan Zynovii Mykhailovych Khmelnytskyi (Ruthenian: Ѕѣнові Богданъ Хмелнiцкiи; modern ; 6 August 1657) was a Ruthenian military commander and Hetman of the Zaporozhian Host, which was then under the suzerainty of the Polish–Lithuanian Commonwealth. He led an uprising against the Commonwealth and its magnates (1648–1654) that resulted in the creation of an independent Ruthenian Cossack state. In 1654, he concluded the Treaty of Pereyaslav with the Russian Tsar and allied the Cossack Hetmanate with Tsardom of Russia, thus placing central Ruthenia under Russian protection. During the uprising the Cossacks led a massacre of thousands of Jewish people during 1648–1649 as one of the more traumatic events in the history of the Jews in Ukraine and Ukrainian nationalism.

Early life

Although there is no definite proof of the date of Khmelnytsky's birth, Russian historian Mykhaylo Maksymovych suggests that it is likely 27 December 1595 Julian (St. Theodore's day). As was the custom in the Orthodox Church, he was baptized with one of his middle names, Theodor, translated into Ruthenian as Bogdan. A biography of Khmelnytsky by Smoliy and Stepankov, however, suggests that it is more likely he was born on 9 November (feast day of St Zenoby, 30 October in Julian calendar) and was baptized on 11 November (feast day of St. Theodore in the Catholic Church).

Khmelnytsky was probably born in the village of Subotiv, near Chyhyryn in the Crown of the Kingdom of Poland at the estate of his father Mykhailo Khmelnytsky. He was born into Ruthenian lesser nobility. His father was a courtier of Great Crown Hetman Stanisław Żółkiewski, but later joined the court of his son-in-law Jan Daniłowicz, who in 1597 became starosta of Korsuń and Chyhyryn and appointed Mykhailo as his deputy in Chyhyryn (pidstarosta). For his service, he was granted a strip of land near the town, where Mykhailo set up a khutor Subotiv.

There has been controversy as to whether Bogdan and his father belonged to the Szlachta (Polish term for noblemen). Some sources state that in 1590 his father Mykhailo was appointed as a sotnyk for the Korsun-Chyhyryn starosta Jan Daniłowicz, who continued to colonize the new Ukrainian lands near the Dnieper river. Khmelnytsky identified as a noble, and his father's status as a pidstarosta of Chyhyryn helped him to be considered as such by others. During the Uprising, however, Khmelnytsky would stress his mother's Cossack roots and his father's exploits with the Cossacks of the Sich.

Khmelnytsky attended a Jesuit college, possibly in Jarosław, but more likely in Lviv in the school founded by hetman Żółkiewski. He completed his schooling by 1617, acquiring a broad knowledge of world history and learning Polish and Latin. Later he learned Turkish, Tatar, and French. Unlike many of the other Jesuit students, he did not embrace Roman Catholicism but remained Orthodox.

Marriage and family
Khmelnytsky married Hanna Somkivna, a sister of a rich Pereyaslavl Cossack; the couple settled in Subotiv. By the second half of the 1620s, they had three daughters: Stepanyda, Olena, and Kateryna. His first son Tymish (Tymofiy) was born in 1632, and another son Yuriy was born in 1640.

Registered Cossack

Upon completion of his studies in 1617, Khmelnytsky entered into service with the Cossacks. As early as 1619, he was sent together with his father to Moldavia, when the Polish–Lithuanian Commonwealth entered into war against the Ottoman Empire. During the battle of Cecora (Țuțora) on 17 September 1620, his father was killed, and young Khmelnytsky, among many others including future hetman Stanisław Koniecpolski, was captured by the Turks. He spent the next two years in captivity in Constantinople as a prisoner of an Ottoman Kapudan Pasha (presumably Parlak Mustafa Pasha). Other sources claim that he spent his slavery in Ottoman Navy on galleys as an oarsman, where he picked up a knowledge of Turkic languages.

While there is no concrete evidence as to his return to the Frontier, most historians believe Khmelnytsky either escaped or was ransomed. Sources vary as to his benefactor – his mother, friends, the Polish king – but perhaps by Krzysztof Zbaraski, ambassador of the Commonwealth to the Ottomans. In 1622 he paid 30,000 thalers in ransom for all prisoners of war captured at the Battle of Cecora. Upon return to Subotiv, Khmelnytsky took over operating his father's estate and became a registered Cossack in the Chyhyryn Regiment.

He most likely did not take part in any of the Cossack uprisings that broke out in Ruthenia at that time. His loyal service achieved him the rank of military clerk (pisarz wojskowy) of the registered Cossacks in 1637. It happened after the capitulation of the Pavlyuk uprising in the town Borowica on 24 December 1637, when field hetman Mikołaj Potocki appointed new Cossack eldership. He had to do it because some of the elders either joined Pavlyuk or were killed by him (like former military clerk, Teodor Onuszkowicz). Because of his new position Khmelnytsky was the one who prepared and signed an act of capitulation. Fighting didn't stop in Borowica, rebel Cossacks rose up again under the new command of Ostryanyn and Hunia in the spring next year. Mikołaj Potocki was successful again and after a six week long siege, the rebel Cossacks were forced to capitulate on 3 August 1638. Like the year before, some registered Cossacks joined the rebels, while some of them remained loyal. Unlike the last time, Potocki decided not to punish the rebel Cossacks, but forced all of them to swear loyalty to the king and the state and swear not to seek  revenge against each other. The Hetman also agreed to their request to send emissaries to the king to seek royal grace and preserve Cossack rights. They were elected on a council on 9 September 1638 in Kyiv. Bohdan Khmelnytsky was one of them; the other three were Iwan Bojaryn, colonel of Kaniów, Roman Połowiec and Jan Wołczenko. The emissaries didn't achieve much, mostly because all decisions were already made by the Sejm earlier this year, when deputies accepted the project presented by the grand Hetman Stanisław Koniecpolski. Cossacks were forced to accept harsh new terms at the next council in Masłowy Staw, at the Ros river. According to one of the articles of the Ordynacya Woyska Zaporowskiego ("Ordinance of the Zaporozhian Army") registered Cossacks lost the right to elect their own officers and a commander, called elder (starszy) or commissar. From now on, the elder was to be nominated by the Sejm, from the Grand Hetman’s recommendation. The Grand Hetman also got the right to appoint all officers. Commissars, colonels and osauls had to be a noblemen, while sotniks and atamans had to be Cossacks, who were "distinguished in a service for Us and the Commonwealth". Khmelnytsky became one of the sotniks of Chyhryn regiment.

In 1663 in Paris Pierre Chevalier published a book about Cossack uprising called Histoire de la guerre des Cosaques contre la Pologne, which he dedicated to Nicolas Léonor de Flesselles, count de Brégy, who was an ambassador to Poland in 1645. In the dedication he described the meeting de Brégy had with Khmelnytsky in France, and group of Cossacks he brought to France to fight against Spain in Flanders. Chevalier also claimed that he himself commanded Cossacks in Flanders. Although in distant parts of the book Chevalier doesn't mention either Cossacks or Khmelnytsky even once. In his other writing, Relation des Cosaques (avec la vie de Kmielniski, tirée d’un Manuscrit), published the same year, which also contains a biography of Khmelnytsky, there is no mention about his or any other Cossacks stay in France or Flanders. Moreover first Chevalier book is the only source that mention such an event, there is not trace of it even in correspondence of count de Brègy. Although it is true that he was conducting a recruitment of soldiers in Poland for French army in years 1646-1648. In fact he succeeded and about 3000 of them travelled via Gdańsk to Flanders and took part in fights around Dunkirk. French sources describes them as infanterie tout Poulonnois qu’Allemand. They were commanded by colonels Krzysztof Przyjemski, Andrzej Przyjemski and Georges Cabray. Second recruitment that shipped off in 1647 were commanded by Jan Pleitner, Dutch military engineer in service of Władysław IV and Jan Denhoff, colonel of Royal Guard. 17th century French historian Jean-François Sarasіn in his Histoire de siège de Dunkerque when describing participation of Polish mercenaries in fights over Dunkirk, notes that they were commanded by some "Sirot". Some historians identify him as Ivan Sirko, Cossack ataman.

Claims that Khmelnytsky and Cossacks were actually in France are supported by some Ukrainian historians, while other and most Polish scholarship finds it unlikely.

Czapliński Affair
Upon the death of magnate Stanisław Koniecpolski (March 1646) his successor, Aleksander, redrew the maps of his possessions. He laid claim to Khmelnytsky's estate, claiming it as his. Trying to find protection from this grab by the powerful magnate, Khmelnytsky wrote numerous appeals and letters to different representatives of the Polish crown but to no avail. At the end of 1645 the Chyhyryn starosta Daniel Czapliński officially received authority from Koniecpolski to seize Khmelnytsky's Subotiv estate.

In the summer of 1646, Khmelnytsky arranged an audience with King Władysław IV to plead his case, as he had favourable standing at the court. Władysław, who wanted Cossacks on his side in the wars he planned, gave Khmelnytsky a royal charter, protecting his rights to the Subotiv estate. But, because of the structure of the Commonwealth at that time and the lawlessness of the frontier, even the King was not able to prevent a confrontation with local magnates. In the beginning of 1647, Daniel Czapliński started to harass Khmelnytsky in order to force him off the land. On two occasions the magnate had Subotiv raided: considerable property damage was done and Khmelnytsky's son Yuriy was badly beaten. Finally, in April 1647, Czapliński succeeded in evicting Khmelnytsky from the land, and he was forced to move with his large family to a relative's house in Chyhyryn.

In May 1647, Khmelnytsky arranged a second audience with the king to plead his case but found him unwilling to confront a powerful magnate. In addition to losing the estate, Khmelnytsky suffered the loss of his wife Hanna, and he was left alone with their children. He promptly remarried, to Motrona (Helena Czaplińska), by that time wife of Daniel Czapliński, the so-called "Helen of the steppe". He was less successful in real estate, and was unable to regain the land and property of his estate or financial compensation for it. During this time, he met several higher Polish officials to discuss the Cossacks' war with the Tatars, and used this occasion again to plead his case with Czapliński, still unsuccessfully.

While Khmelnytsky found no support from the Polish officials, he found it in his Cossack friends and subordinates. His Chyhyryn regiment and others were on his side. All through the autumn of 1647 Khmelnytsky travelled from one regiment to another, and had numerous consultations with Cossack leaders throughout Ukraine. His activity raised suspicion among the local Polish authorities already used to Cossack revolts; he was promptly arrested. Koniecpolski issued an order for his execution, but the Chyhyryn Cossack polkovnyk, who held Khmelnytsky, was persuaded to release him. Not willing to tempt fate any further, Khmelnytsky headed for the Zaporozhian Sich with a group of his supporters.

Uprising

While the Czapliński Affair is generally regarded as the immediate cause of the uprising, it was primarily a catalyst for actions representing rising popular discontent. Religion, ethnicity, and economics factored into this discontent. While the Polish–Lithuanian Commonwealth remained a union of nations, a sizable population of Orthodox Ruthenians were ignored. Oppressed by the Polish magnates, they took their wrath out on Poles, as well as the Jews, who often managed the estates of Polish nobles. The advent of the Counter-Reformation worsened relations between the Orthodox and Catholic Churches. Many Orthodox Ukrainians considered the Union of Brest as a threat to their Orthodox faith.

Initial successes
At the end of 1647 Khmelnytsky reached the estuary of the Dnieper river. On 7 December, his small detachment (300–500 men), with the help of registered Cossacks who went over to his side, disarmed the small Polish detachment guarding the area and took over the Zaporozhian Sich. The Poles attempted to retake the Sich but were decisively defeated as more registered Cossacks joined the forces. At the end of January 1648, a Cossack Rada was called and Khmelnytsky was unanimously elected a hetman. A period of feverish activity followed. Cossacks were sent with hetman's letters to many regions of Ukraine calling on Cossacks and Orthodox peasants to join the rebellion, Khortytsia was fortified, efforts were made to acquire and make weapons and ammunition, and emissaries were sent to the Khan of Crimea, İslâm III Giray.

Initially, Polish authorities took the news of Khmelnytsky's arrival at the Sich and reports about the rebellion lightly. The two sides exchanged lists of demands: the Poles asked the Cossacks to surrender the mutinous leader and disband, while Khmelnytsky and the Rada demanded that the Commonwealth restore the Cossacks' ancient rights, stop the advance of the Ukrainian Greek Catholic Church, yield the right to appoint Orthodox leaders of the Sich and of the Registered Cossack regiments, and to remove Commonwealth troops from Ukraine. The Polish magnates considered the demands an affront, and an army headed by Stefan Potocki moved in the direction of the Sich.

Had the Cossacks stayed at Khortytsia, they might have been defeated, as in many other rebellions. However, Khmelnytsky marched against the Poles. The two armies met on 16 May 1648 at Zhovti Vody, where, aided by the Tatars of Tugay Bey, the Cossacks inflicted their first crushing defeat on the Commonwealth. It was repeated soon afterwards, with the same success, at the Battle of Korsuń on 26 May 1648. Khmelnytsky used his diplomatic and military skills: under his leadership, the Cossack army moved to battle positions following his plans, Cossacks were proactive and decisive in their manoeuvrers and attacks, and most importantly, he gained the support of both large contingents of registered Cossacks and the Crimean Khan, his crucial ally for the many battles to come.

Establishment of Cossack Hetmanate

The Patriarch of Jerusalem Paiseus, who was visiting Kyiv at this time, referred to Khmelnytsky as the Prince of Rus, the head of an independent Ukrainian state, according to contemporaries. In February 1649, during negotiations in Pereiaslav with a Polish delegation headed by Senator Adam Kysil, Khmelnytsky declared that he was "the sole autocrat of Rus" and that he had "enough power in Ukraine, Podilia, and Volhynia... in his land and principality stretching as far as Lviv, Chełm, and Halych."

After the period of initial military successes, the state-building process began. His leadership was demonstrated in all areas of state-building: military, administration, finance, economics and culture. Khmelnytsky made the Zaporozhian Host the supreme power in the new Ukrainian state and unified all the spheres of Ukrainian society under his authority. Khmelnytsky built a new government system and developed military and civilian administration.

A new generation of statesmen and military leaders came to the forefront: Ivan Vyhovsky, Pavlo Teteria, Danylo Nechai and Ivan Nechai, Ivan Bohun, Hryhoriy Hulyanytsky. From Cossack polkovnyks, officers, and military commanders, a new elite within the Cossack Hetman state was born. Throughout the years, the elite preserved and maintained the autonomy of the Cossack Hetmanate in the face of Russia's attempt to curb it. It was also instrumental in the onset of the period of Ruin that followed, eventually destroying most of the achievements of the Khmelnytsky era.

Complications

Khmelnytsky's initial successes were followed by a series of setbacks as neither Khmelnytsky nor the Commonwealth had enough strength to stabilise the situation or to inflict a defeat on the enemy. What followed was a period of intermittent warfare and several peace treaties, which were seldom upheld. From spring 1649 onward, the situation turned for the worse for the Cossacks; as Polish attacks increased in frequency, they became more successful. The resulting Treaty of Zboriv on 18 August 1649 was unfavourable for the Cossacks. It was followed by another defeat at the battle of Berestechko on 18 June 1651 in which the Tatars betrayed Khmelnytsky and held the hetman captive. The Cossacks suffered a crushing defeat, with an estimated 30,000 casualties. They were forced to sign the Treaty of Bila Tserkva, which favoured the Polish-Lithuanian Commonwealth. Warfare broke open again and, in the years that followed, the two sides were almost perpetually at war. Now, the Crimean Tatars played a decisive role and did not allow either side to prevail. It was in their interests to keep both Ukraine and the Polish–Lithuanian Commonwealth from getting too strong and becoming an effective power in the region.

Khmelnytsky started looking for another foreign ally. Although the Cossacks had established their de facto independence from Poland, the new state needed legitimacy, which could be provided by a foreign monarch. In search of a protectorate, Khmelnytsky approached the Ottoman sultan in 1651, and formal embassies were exchanged. The Turks offered vassalship, like their other arrangements with contemporary Crimea, Moldavia and Wallachia. However, the idea of a union with the Muslim monarch was not acceptable to the general populace and most Cossacks.

The other possible ally was the Orthodox tsar of Moskovia. That government remained quite cautious and stayed away from the hostilities in Ukraine. In spite of numerous envoys and calls for help from Khmelnytsky in the name of the shared Orthodox faith, the tsar preferred to wait, until the threat of a Cossack-Ottoman union in 1653 finally forced him to action. The idea that the tsar might be favourable to taking Ukraine under his hand was communicated to the hetman and so diplomatic activity intensified.

Treaty with tsar

After a series of negotiations, it was agreed that the Cossacks would accept overlordship by the Tsar Alexei Mikhailovich. To finalize the treaty, a Russian embassy led by boyar Vasily Buturlin came to Pereyaslav, where, on 18 January 1654, the Cossack Rada was called and the treaty concluded. Historians have not come to consensus in interpreting the intentions of the tsar and Khmelnytsky in signing this agreement. The treaty legitimized Russian claims to the capital of Kievan Rus' and strengthened the tsar's influence in the region. Khmelnytsky needed the treaty to gain a legitimate monarch's protection and support from a friendly Orthodox power.

Historians have differed in their reading of Khmelnytsky's goal with the union: whether it was to be a military union, a suzerainty, or a complete incorporation of Ukraine into the Tsardom of Russia.

The differences were expressed during the ceremony of the oath of allegiance to the tsar: the Russian envoy refused to reciprocate with an oath from the ruler to his subjects, as the Cossacks and Ruthenians expected since it was the custom of the Polish king.

Khmelnytsky stormed out of the church and threatened to cancel the entire treaty. The Cossacks decided to rescind the demand and abide by the treaty.

Final years
As a result of the 1654 Treaty of Pereyaslav, the geopolitical map of the region changed. Russia entered the scene, and the Cossacks' former allies, the Tatars, had switched sides and gone over to the Polish side, initiating warfare against Khmelnytsky and his forces. Tatar raids depopulated whole areas of Sich. Cossacks, aided by the Tsar's army, took revenge on Polish possessions in Belarus, and in the spring of 1654, the Cossacks drove the Poles from much of the country. Sweden entered the mêlée. Old adversaries of both Poland and Russia, they occupied a share of Lithuania before the Russians could get there.

The occupation displeased Russia because the tsar sought to take over the Swedish Baltic provinces. In 1656, with the Commonwealth increasingly war-torn but also increasingly hostile and successful against the Swedes, the ruler of Transylvania, George II Rákóczi, also joined in. Charles X of Sweden had solicited his help because of the massive Polish popular opposition and resistance against the Swedes. Under blows from all sides, the Commonwealth barely survived.

Russia attacked Sweden in July 1656, while its forces were deeply involved in Poland. That war ended in status quo two years later, but it complicated matters for Khmelnytsky, as his ally was now fighting his overlord. In addition to diplomatic tensions between the tsar and Khmelnytsky, a number of other disagreements between the two surfaced. In particular, they concerned Russian officials' interference in the finances of the Cossack Hetmanate and in the newly captured Belarus. The tsar concluded a separate treaty with the Poles in Vilnius in 1656. The Hetman's emissaries were not even allowed to attend the negotiations.

Khmelnytsky wrote an irate letter to the tsar accusing him of breaking the Pereyaslav agreement. He compared the Swedes to the tsar and said that the former were more honourable and trustworthy than the Russians.

In Poland, the Cossack army and Transylvanian allies suffered a number of setbacks. As a result, Khmelnytsky had to deal with a Cossack rebellion on the home front. Troubling news also came from Crimea, as Tatars, in alliance with Poland, were preparing for a new invasion of Ukraine. Though already ill, Khmelnytsky continued to conduct diplomatic activity, at one point even receiving the tsar's envoys from his bed.

On 22 July, he suffered a cerebral hemorrhage and became paralysed after his audience with the Kyiv Colonel Zhdanovich. His expedition to Halychyna had failed because of mutiny within his army. Less than a week later, Bohdan Khmelnytsky died at 5 a.m. on 27 July 1657. His funeral was held on 23 August, and his body was taken from his capital, Chyhyryn, to his estate, at Subotiv, for burial in his ancestral church. In 1664 a Polish hetman Stefan Czarniecki recaptured Subotiv, which according to some Ukrainian historians, ordered the bodies of the hetman and his son, Tymish, to be exhumed and desecrated, while others claim that is not the case.

Influences 
Khmelnytsky had a crucial influence on the history of Ukraine. He not only shaped the future of Ukraine but affected the balance of power in Europe, as the weakening of Poland-Lithuania was exploited by Austria, Saxony, Prussia, and Russia. His actions and role in events were viewed differently by different contemporaries, and even now there are greatly differing perspectives on his legacy.

Ukrainian assessment

In Ukraine, Khmelnytsky is generally regarded as a national hero. A city and a region of the country bear his name. His image is prominently displayed on Ukrainian banknotes and his monument in the centre of Kiev is a focal point of the Ukrainian capital. There have also been several issues of the Order of Bohdan Khmelnytsky – one of the highest decorations in Ukraine and in the former Soviet Union.

However, with all this positive appreciation of his legacy, even in Ukraine it is far from being unanimous. He is criticised for his union with Russia, which in the view of some, proved to be disastrous for the future of the country. Prominent Ukrainian poet, Taras Shevchenko, was one of Khmelnytsky's very vocal and harsh critics. Others criticize him for his alliance with the Crimean Tatars, which permitted the latter to take a large number of Ukrainian peasants as slaves. (The Cossacks as a military caste did not protect the kholopy, the lowest stratum of the Ukrainian people). Folk songs capture this. On the balance, the view of his legacy in present-day Ukraine is more positive than negative, with some critics acknowledging that the union with Russia was dictated by necessity and an attempt to survive in those difficult times.

In a 2018 Ukraine's Rating Sociological Group poll, 73% of Ukrainian respondents had a positive attitude to Khmelnytsky.

Polish assessment
Khmelnytsky's role in the history of the Polish State has been viewed mostly in a negative light. The rebellion of 1648 proved to be the end of the Golden Age of the Commonwealth and the beginning of its demise. Although it survived the rebellion and the following war, within a hundred years it was divided amongst Russia, Prussia, and Austria in the partitions of Poland. Many Poles blamed Khmelnytsky for the decline of the Commonwealth.

Khmelnytsky has been a subject to several works of fiction in the 19th century Polish literature, but the most notable treatment of him in Polish literature is found in Henryk Sienkiewicz's With Fire and Sword. The rather critical portrayal of him by Sienkiewicz has been moderated in the 1999 movie adaptation by Jerzy Hoffman.

Russian and Soviet history
The official Russian historiography stressed the fact that Khmelnytsky entered into union with Moscow's Tsar Alexei Mikhailovich with an expressed desire to "re-unify" Ukraine with Russia. This view corresponded with the official theory of Moscow as an heir of the Kievan Rus', which appropriately gathered its former territories.

Khmelnytsky was viewed as a national hero of Russia for bringing Ukraine into the "eternal union" of all the Russias – Great (Russia), Little (Ukraine) and White (Belarus) Russia. As such, he was much respected and venerated during the existence of the Russian Empire. His role was presented as a model for all Ukrainians to follow: to aspire for closer ties with Great Russia. This view was expressed in a monument commissioned by the Russian nationalist Mikhail Yuzefovich, which was installed in the centre of Kyiv in 1888.

Russian authorities decided the original version of the monument (created by Russian sculptor Mikhail Mikeshin) was too xenophobic; it was to depict a vanquished Pole, Jew, and a Catholic priest under the hooves of the horse. The inscription on the monument reads "To Bohdan Khmelnytsky from one and indivisible Russia." Mikeshin also created the Monument to the Millennium of Russia in Novgorod, which has Khmelnytsky shown as one of Russia's prominent figures.

Soviet historiography followed in many ways the Imperial Russian theory of re-unification while adding the class struggle dimension to the story. Khmelnytsky was praised not only for re-unifying Ukraine with Russia, but also for organizing the class struggle of oppressed Ukrainian peasants against Polish exploiters.

Jewish history

The assessment of Khmelnytsky in Jewish history is overwhelmingly negative because he blamed Jews in assisting Polish szlachta, as the former were often employed by them as tax collectors. Bohdan sought to eradicate Jews from Ukraine. Thus, according to the treaty of Zboriv all Jewish people were forbidden to live on the territory controlled by Cossack rebels.

The Khmelnytsky Uprising led to the deaths of at least a couple thousands of Jews living in the territory. Due to the lack of reliable data for the assessment of the local Jewish population's size and the amount of victims, giving a more accurate estimate is a tough if not impossible task for historians. Atrocity stories about massacre victims who had been buried alive, cut to pieces or forced to kill one another spread throughout Europe and beyond. The pogroms contributed to a revival of the ideas of Isaac Luria, who revered the Kabbalah, and the identification of Sabbatai Zevi as the Messiah. Orest Subtelny writes:
Between 1648 and 1656, tens of thousands of Jews—given the lack of reliable data, it is impossible to establish more accurate figures—were killed by the rebels, and to this day the Khmelnytsky uprising is considered by Jews to be one of the most traumatic events in their history.

Commemoration 
The Ukrainian city of Khmelnytskyi is named after Khmelnytsky.
In most Ukrainian cities there are Bohdan Khmelnytskyi streets, as well as Bohdan Khmelnytskyi Avenue in the city of Dnipro.
The Separate Presidential Brigade "Hetman Bohdan Khmelnytskyi", a unit of the Armed Forces of Ukraine tasked with protecting the president of Ukraine, is named in honor of Khmelnytsky.

See also
Bohdan Khmelnytsky Bridge in Moscow
List of Ukrainian rulers
Order of Bohdan Khmelnytsky, a state military award in Ukraine
Order of Bogdan Khmelnitsky (Soviet Union)
With Fire and Sword (1884), an historical novel by the Polish author Henryk Sienkiewicz about these events.

References

Further reading

 Władysław Andrzej Serczyk, Na dalekiej Ukrainie. Dzieje Kozaczyzny do 1648 roku, Kraków 2008.
 Władysław Andrzej Serczyk, Na płonącej Ukrainie. Dzieje Kozaczyzny 1648-1651, Kraków 2009.
 Valeriy Smoliy, Valeriy Stepankov, Bohdan Khmelnytsky. Sotsialno-politychnyi portret Second Edition. Lebid, Kyiv. 1995. .
 Orest Subtelny. Ukraine. A history. University of Toronto press. 1994. .
 Zbigniew Wójcik, Czy Kozacy Zaporoscy byli na służbie Mazarina?, "Przegląd Historyczny", vol. 64/3 (1973).
 Stephen Velychenko,  The influence of historical, political and social ideas on the politics of Bohdan Khmelnytsky and the Cossack officers between 1648 and 1657, Ph.D. dissertation, University of London, 1981.
Mykhailo Hrushevsky. History of Ukraine-Rus’. Volume 8, The Cossack Age, 1626 to 1650: trans. Marta Daria Olynyk, ed. Frank Sysyn, with Myroslav Yurkevich.  2002.
Mykhailo Hrushevsky. History of Ukraine-Rus’. Volume 9-1, The Khmelnytsky Era, 1651 to 1653: trans. Bohdan Strumiński, ed. Serhii Plokhy and Frank E. Sysyn, with Uliana M. Pasicznyk.  2005.
Mykhailo Hrushevsky. History of Ukraine-Rus’. Volume 9-2, The Khmelnytsky Era, 1654 to 1657, part 1: trans. Marta Daria Olynyk, ed. Serhii Plokhy and Frank E. Sysyn, with Myroslav Yurkevich. 2008.
Mykhailo Hrushevsky. History of Ukraine-Rus’. Volume 9-2, The Khmelnytsky Era, 1654 to 1657, part 2: trans. Marta Daria Olynyk, ed. Yaroslav Fedoruk and Frank E. Sysyn, with Myroslav Yurkevich. 2010.

External links

 
Oleksander Ohloblyn, Khmelnytsky, Bohdan, article originally appeared in the Encyclopedia of Ukraine, vol. 2 (1989).
Cossack State after 1649 (map)
Biography of Bohdan Khmelnytsky
Mykola Mashchenko, Film about Khmelnytsky (2008), Dovzhenko Film Studios
Dr. Henry Abramson, Video on Nathan of Hanover and the Ukrainian Revolution of 1648–1649, 19 February 2013, Jewish Biography as History, Jewish History lectures, Henry Abramson website

 
 

1590s births
1657 deaths
Year of birth uncertain
Antisemitism in Ukraine
17th-century Ukrainian people
Founding monarchs
Hetmans of Zaporizhian Host
People from Cherkasy Oblast